Rikuzentakata, Iwate, held a mayoral election on February 4, 2007. Nagato Nakasato beat incumbent mayor Akihiko Yoshida.

Candidates 

 Akihiko Yoshida, incumbent mayor and former city assembly member supported by the Democratic Party of Japan (DPJ)
 Nagato Nakasato, former city assembly member and candidate for the Japanese Communist Party (JCP)

Results

References 
 Results from JanJan 
 Japan Press coverage

Rikuzentakata, Iwate
2007 elections in Japan
Mayoral elections in Japan
February 2007 events in Japan